Lycaena arota, the tailed copper, is a butterfly of the family Lycaenidae. It is found in North America from New Mexico north and west to Oregon, south to southern California and Baja California, Mexico.

The average wingspan ranges from 30–35 mm. Each hindwing has a tail. The upper surface of the males is copper brown with an iridescent purple sheen. The upperside of the females has an orange and dark brown pattern. The underside of both males and females is gray, with black spots on the forewings and a band of white crescents on the hindwings. Adults are on wing from May to August in one generation per year. The migration of butterflies can be caused by various factors such as the distribution of food plants, evasion of natural enemies, and climate change. They feed on flower nectar.

The larvae feed on the leaves of Ribes species. The species overwinters as an egg.
It is commonly confused with two other species, The Lycaena gorgon  and L. xanthoides .

Subspecies
 Lycaena arota arota
 Lycaena arota virginiensis Edwards, 1870 (California, Nevada, Colorado)
 Lycaena arota nubila (Comstock, 1926) (California) – clouded copper
 Lycaena arota schellbachi (Tilden, 1955) (Arizona) – Schellbach's copper

References

Butterflies described in 1852
Lycaena
Lycaenidae of South America